"Things Just Ain't the Same" is a song by Canadian singer Deborah Cox. It was written by Nicole Renée, Alfred "Bob" Antoine, and Andre Evans and recorded by Cox for the soundtrack to the comedy film Money Talks (1997), with production helmed by Antoine and Evans. The song is built around a sample of "You Are Everything" (1971) by American soul group The Stylistics. Due to the inclusion of the sample, Thom Bell and Linda Creed are also credited as songwriters. The song was later included as a Dance mix on her second studio album One Wish (1998).

Charts

References

1997 songs
1997 singles
Deborah Cox songs
Songs written by Nicole Renée
Songs written by Thom Bell
Songs written by Linda Creed